Eliah Drinkwitz (born April 12, 1983) is an American football coach. He is the head football coach at the University of Missouri in Columbia, Missouri, a position he has held since the 2020 season. Drinkwitz served as the head  football coach at Appalachian State University in 2019. He was previously an assistant coach at North Carolina State University, Boise State University, Arkansas State University, and Auburn University.

Coaching career

Auburn
After coaching at Springdale High School (Arkansas), where he coached with Gus Malzahn in 2004, Drinkwitz moved to Auburn in 2009 to work on football operations as the quality control coach, and was on the coaching staff when Auburn won the 2010 National Championship under Gene Chizik.

Arkansas State
In 2012, after two successful seasons with Auburn, he followed Malzahn to Arkansas State, where he spent the 2012 and 2013 seasons as running backs coach, and in 2013 also served as co-offensive coordinator.

Boise State
In 2014, when Arkansas State head coach Bryan Harsin became head coach at Boise State, Drinkwitz joined his staff as the tight ends coach.  In 2015, he was promoted to offensive coordinator and quarterbacks coach.

NC State
In 2016, Drinkwitz was named offensive coordinator and quarterbacks coach at NC State.  He served in this position for three seasons, during which he won two bowl games and won 25 games.  The Wolfpack also finished at #23 in the AP Poll in 2017.

Appalachian State
On December 13, 2018, Drinkwitz was hired as the head coach at Appalachian State University. In his one season as head coach of the Mountaineers, he finished 12-1, with a victory over Louisiana in the 2019 Sun Belt championship. He did not coach their bowl game.

Missouri
On December 9, 2019, Drinkwitz was hired as the head coach of the Missouri Tigers, replacing Barry Odom.  In his first season with Mizzou, the Tigers compiled a record of 5–5, including a win over defending national champion LSU, who also finished 5-5.

On December 23, 2022, Wake Forest Demon Deacons football beat Missouri 27-17 in the Gasparilla Bowl. The loss made Drinkwitz 0-2 in career bowl games. The loss also made Missouri 6-7 on the year, making it the third consecutive year Drinkwitz and the Tigers finished without a winning record.

Personal life
Drinkwitz was born in Norman, Oklahoma to Jerry and Susie Drinkwitz, but his parents and older siblings moved to the Alma, Arkansas area in 1984 when Eli was a year old. Being raised in Alma and playing football for the Alma Airedales is what led him to want to become a football coach, especially hearing the stories of his father playing for Luther College in Decorah, Iowa during the 1960s. During his time at Alma, he was an All-Conference and All-State selection and was named FCA Huddle Leader of the Year. He then chose to go to Russellville and received a bachelor's degree in education from Arkansas Tech University in 2004. Drinkwitz and his wife Lindsey have four daughters. After being hired by the University of Missouri, he moved to Columbia, Missouri.

Head coaching record

* Departed Appalachian State for Missouri before bowl game

Notes

References

External links
 Missouri profile

1983 births
Living people
Appalachian State Mountaineers football coaches
Arkansas State Red Wolves football coaches
Auburn Tigers football coaches
Boise State Broncos football coaches
Missouri Tigers football coaches
NC State Wolfpack football coaches
High school football coaches in Arkansas
Arkansas Tech University alumni
Sportspeople from Norman, Oklahoma